Park Place is an American sitcom that aired on CBS from April 9 to April 30, 1981.

Premise
A legal-aid clinic in Manhattan full of young lawyers and their sage directors, the clinic took cases based on a "take a number" method.

Cast
Harold Gould as David Ross
Lionel Smith as Mac
Mary Elaine Monti as Jo
James Widdoes as Brad
Don Calfa as Howie
David Clennon as Jeff
Alan Drummond as Frances
Cal Gibson as Ernie

Episodes

References

External links

Review at The New York Times

1981 American television series debuts
1981 American television series endings
1980s American sitcoms
1980s American legal television series
English-language television shows
CBS original programming
Television series by Warner Bros. Television Studios
Television shows set in New York City